Bow River is a  long tributary of the Ord River in the Kimberley region of northern Western Australia. The river was named by pastoralist Michael Durack in 1882 after the Bow River in his family's ancestral home of County Clare, Ireland.

The river flows into the Ord River at Lake Argyle.

There are 12 tributaries of the Bow River including Wilson River, Turkey Creek, Limestone Creek and Spring Creek.

Bow River is the subject of the famous song of the same name by the iconic Australian pub rock band Cold Chisel. The song was later covered by its composer, Cold Chisel member Ian Moss.

References

Rivers of the Kimberley region of Western Australia